Chavei Cove (‘Zaliv Chavei’ \'za-liv cha-'ve-i\) is the 2.2 km wide cove indenting for 900 m the southeast coast of Rozhen Peninsula on Livingston Island in the South Shetland Islands, Antarctica entered east of Gela Point.  It is formed as a result of the retreat of Prespa Glacier in the early 21st century.

The feature is named after the settlement of Chavei in northern Bulgaria.

Location
Bulgarian mapping in 2009.

Maps
 L.L. Ivanov. Antarctica: Livingston Island and Greenwich, Robert, Snow and Smith Islands. Scale 1:120000 topographic map.  Troyan: Manfred Wörner Foundation, 2009.  
 L.L. Ivanov. Antarctica: Livingston Island and Smith Island. Scale 1:100000 topographic map. Manfred Wörner Foundation, 2017. 
 Antarctic Digital Database (ADD). Scale 1:250000 topographic map of Antarctica. Scientific Committee on Antarctic Research (SCAR). Since 1993, regularly upgraded and updated

References
 Chavei Cove. SCAR Composite Antarctic Gazetteer.
 Bulgarian Antarctic Gazetteer. Antarctic Place-names Commission. (details in Bulgarian, basic data in English)

External links
 Chepra Cove. Copernix satellite image

Coves of Livingston Island
Bulgaria and the Antarctic